Anya Jibon  is a Bangladeshi Bengali language film that was released in 1995. The film's screenplay and directed by acclaimed filmmaker Sheikh Niamat Ali and also produced the film from his own banner S Niamot Ali productions. The film stars Raisul Islam Asad, Champa, Abul Khair, Shanta Islam, Chitralekha Guho, Tamalika Karmokar and Others. In 1991, the film received the National Film Award for the best film award with the other 11 categories.

Cast 
 Raisul Islam Asad
 Champa
 Abul Khair
 Shanta Islam
 Chitralekha Guho
 Tamalika Karmakar
 Saifuddin
 Master Tonmoy

Music
Goriber Bou films music directed by Amanul Haque.

Awards

References

Government of Bangladesh grants films

External links

1995 films
Bengali-language Bangladeshi films
Films scored by Amanul Haque
1990s Bengali-language films
Best Film Bachsas Award winners
Best Film National Film Award (Bangladesh) winners
Films whose writer won the Best Screenplay National Film Award (Bangladesh)